Christina Henderson (born October 10, 1985) is an American politician in Washington, D.C. who was elected to the Council of the District of Columbia as an at-large member in 2020. Henderson previously worked for her predecessor, David Grosso, and served as a legislative aide in Congress. Henderson is an independent, not registered with any political party.

Early life and education
Henderson was born in Brooklyn, New York. Her mother joined the U.S. Army when she was young, leading the family to relocate multiple times. She considers Washington, D.C. her first permanent home. She attended Furman University, where she was the first black student body president, and was a member of Alpha Kappa Alpha sorority.

Career
Henderson worked in D.C. Public Schools on teacher effectiveness and as Deputy Chief of Staff for Councilmember David Grosso. After leaving his office, Henderson worked as a legislative assistant for U.S. Senator Chuck Schumer before launching her campaign for the Council. It was the first campaign she had undertaken.

Positions
As a candidate, Henderson said one of the first bills she plans to introduce is for ranked choice voting, as the current system favors incumbents. She is a skeptic of "defunding the police," saying that the Metropolitan Police Department should keep its current size. She supports tax increases on the wealthy and reforms to rent control.

Campaign
Henderson switched her party affiliation to run as an independent and received an endorsement from The Washington Post. She garnered 15 percent of the vote to win the seat among 23 candidates. She ran using public financing, which capped the amount she could accept from individuals, and was a program created through legislation she worked on as a staffer.

Personal life
She and her husband, Nu, have a daughter. They live in Petworth and have a rescue dog, Langston.

References

1985 births
21st-century American politicians
21st-century American women politicians
Furman University alumni
Living people
Members of the Council of the District of Columbia
Princeton University alumni
Washington, D.C., government officials
Washington, D.C., Independents
Women city councillors in the District of Columbia